Myan Aung is a town in the Ayeyarwady Region of south-west Burma. It is the seat of the Myanaung Township in the Hinthada District.

Populated places in Ayeyarwady Region
Township capitals of Myanmar